Ceratomegilla undecimnotata is a species of black-spotted lady beetles belonging to the family Coccinellidae, subfamily Coccinellinae.

Description
Body is elongated. Elytra are orange-red, while pronotum is black, sometimes with a small white line at the front edge. Elytra show a central black spot and 10 lateral black spots. There are a total of eleven spots (hence the Latin species name undecimnotata), but some spots sometimes are small and barely visible.

This species can be confused with Coccinella septempunctata, but it is smaller and more oval, the central spot above the pronotum is more triangular than round and  there is no white around it.

Adults can be encountered from March through October. They mainly feed on aphids.

Distribution
This quite rare species can be found in central and southern Europe.

Habitat
It occurs in open, sunny environments (sunny forest edges, meadows, herbaceous, and dry grasslands, etc.).

Bibliography
Dimitrios P. Papachristos - Adverse effects of soil applied insecticides on the predatory coccinellid Hippodamia undecimnotata (Coleoptera: Coccinellidae)
Dimitrios C. Kontodimas - Phenology of Hippodamia undecimnotata (Col.: Coccinellidae) in Greece
Panayotis KATSOYANNOS, Dimitris C. KONTODIMAS, George STATHAS Summer diapause and winter quiescence of Hippodamia (Semiadalia) undecimnotata (Coleoptera: Coccinellidae) in central Greece

References

Coccinellidae
Beetles of Europe
Beetles described in 1792